The North Sylamore Creek Bridge is a historic bridge in the Ozark-St. Francis National Forest in northern Stone County, Arkansas. It is a Baltimore deck truss bridge, carrying Forest Service Road 1102 over North Sylamore Creek near the Gunner Pool Recreation Area. It rests on concrete piers and abutments. The bridge was built in 1931, and is the only known example of this type of truss (a variant of the more-common Pratt truss) in the state.

The bridge was listed on the National Register of Historic Places in 2010.

See also 
National Register of Historic Places listings in Stone County, Arkansas
List of bridges on the National Register of Historic Places in Arkansas

References 

Road bridges on the National Register of Historic Places in Arkansas
Bridges completed in 1931
National Register of Historic Places in Stone County, Arkansas
Pratt truss bridges in the United States
Baltimore truss bridges